Change/Return/Success is the first long playing album by British band Neils Children, released in August 2004 on Soft City Recordings.

Background 
After releasing the critically acclaimed ltd. edition vinyl only singles 'Come Down' and 'I Hate Models' the group entered the studio to record extra tracks for a CD mini-album release, which also featured both singles' A and B sides for those unable to purchase the vinyl releases. Although not intended to be regarded as the band's first album proper, the collection was highly acclaimed by both critics and fans alike and can be marked as an important early step in the group's career.

Musical style 
The music featured on the album draws heavily from the British post-punk genre, with influences such as Gang of Four and Public Image Limited highly audible. Alongside these more aggressive and angular sound are psychedelic and space rock influences, such as the group's love of Syd Barrett's early Pink Floyd. The name of the album was taken from Barrett's use of the I Ching tome in his song Chapter 24.

Some songs show a nod to the then contemporary dance-punk revival, with "Trying to Be Someone Else for Free" featuring the 'four to the floor' drum beat adopted by bands like Liars and The Rapture. Others present an almost grunge rock bent, and tracks "Come Down" and "How Does It Feel Now You're on Your Own" reminiscent of In Utero era Nirvana.

Critical reception 
The album's release saw strong support from publications such as the NME. They awarded the album 8/10 and claimed it to be 'absolutely vital'. The following year they also included Neils Children singer John Linger in their yearly 'Cool List' feature, coming in at 30 out of 50 places. The group were largely favoured by the magazine and around the time of release were regularly included in interview and review features.

Online music site Gigwise awarded the album 4 and a half stars out of 5, the only gripe being the record's short running time.

Track listing 

 Come Down
 How Does It Feel Now You're on Your Own?
 I Hate Models
 Trying to Be Someone Else for Free
 Getting Evil in the Playground
 What Will You Say to Me?
 In the Past
 See Through Me

(Hidden Track: Nwod Emoc)

Personnel
John Linger –  Guitar, vocals
James Hair – Bass
Brandon Jacobs – Drums

All songs written by John Linger.

Recorded at Bark Studio by Brian O'Shaughnessey.
Produced by Brian O'Shaughnessey and Neils Children.
Cover photography by Dean Chalkley and Paul Linger.

References

External links 
 Official Neils Children
 Official Neils Children Facebook page
 Official Neils Children Twitter page
 Boudoir Moderne Records Bandcamp page

2004 debut albums
Neils Children albums